Bagmati is a municipality in Sarlahi District, a part of Province No. 2 in Nepal. It was formed in 2016 occupying current 12 sections (wards) from previous 12 former VDCs. It occupies an area of 101.18 km2 with a total population of 42,341.

References 

Populated places in Sarlahi District
Nepal municipalities established in 2017
Municipalities in Madhesh Province